Raja Ranajit Kishore Government Polytechnic, established in 2014, is a government polytechnic located in Ramgarh, Jhargram district, West Bengal.

About college
This polytechnic is affiliated to the West Bengal State Council of Technical Education,  and recognized by AICTE, New Delhi. This polytechnic offers diploma courses in Computer Science & Technology, Electrical Engineering and Mechanical Engineering.

Faculty

See also

References

External links
Official website WBSCTE
http://www.rrkgovtpolytechnic.in/index.php
http://www.jobsfordiploma.com/
http://rrkgpolytechnic.in/

Universities and colleges in Jhargram district
Educational institutions established in 2014
2014 establishments in West Bengal
Technical universities and colleges in West Bengal